Ficus albipila, the abbey tree, is a species of flowering plant in the family Moraceae, native to India, the Andaman and Nicobar Islands, Thailand, Peninsular Malaysia, Sumatra, Java, the Lesser Sunda Islands, New Guinea, and Queensland. It is a widespread rainforest tree reaching .

References

albipila
Flora of India (region)
Flora of the Andaman Islands
Flora of the Nicobar Islands
Flora of Thailand
Flora of Malaya
Flora of Sumatra
Flora of Java
Flora of the Lesser Sunda Islands
Flora of New Guinea
Flora of Queensland
Plants described in 1888